Bar 20 Rides Again is a 1935 American Western film directed by Howard Bretherton and written by Gerald Geraghty and Doris Schroeder. The film stars William Boyd, James Ellison, Jean Rouverol, George "Gabby" Hayes, Harry Worth, Frank McGlynn Jr. and Howard Lang. The film was released on December 6, 1935, by Paramount Pictures.

This is the third film in the Hopalong Cassidy series and the first in which George "Gabby" Hayes plays Cassidy's sidekick Windy (not yet "Gabby").

Plot
Hoppy gets a letter from the father of Johnny's girlfriend asking for help against rustlers. He also asks Hoppy to bring Red, but not Johnny because Margaret is now enamoured with an Easterner. Johnny doesn't believe it and, without Hoppy's knowledge, he races off to marry Margaret. Hoppy and Red follow 3 hours behind to help the rancher against the rustler known as "Nevada".

Cast  
 William Boyd as Bill 'Hopalong' Cassidy
 James Ellison as Johnny Nelson 
 Jean Rouverol as Margaret Arnold
 George "Gabby" Hayes as Windy
 Harry J. Worth as George Perdue
 Frank McGlynn Jr. as Red Connors
 Howard Lang as Jim Arnold
 Ethel Wales as Clarissa 'Clary' Peters
 Paul Fix as Henchman Gila
 J. P. McGowanas Buck Peters
 Joe Rickson as Henchman Herb Layton
 Al St. John as Henchman Cinco
 John Merton as Henchman Carp
 Frank Layton as Henchman Elbows
 Chill Wills as Background Singer / Henchman 
 Chill Wills and His Avalon Boys as Background Musicians

References

External links 
 
 
 
 

1935 films
American Western (genre) films
1935 Western (genre) films
Paramount Pictures films
Films directed by Howard Bretherton
Hopalong Cassidy films
American black-and-white films
1930s English-language films
1930s American films